Farley is an unincorporated community in Summers County, West Virginia, United States. Farley is near the New River, south of Hinton.

References

Unincorporated communities in Summers County, West Virginia
Unincorporated communities in West Virginia